Ella Zeller (married name Ella Constantinescu; born 26 November 1933) is a retired Romanian table tennis player, coach and administrator. From 1952 to 1964 she won several medals in singles, doubles, and team events in the Table Tennis European Championships and in the World Table Tennis Championships. In 1995 she was inducted to the ITTF Hall of Fame.

Zeller began training in table tennis in Timișoara and then moved to Bucharest. She graduated from an institute of physical education, and after retiring from competitions worked as a table tennis coach with the national team (1967–1989). She also took leading positions in the national and European tennis table federations and served as President of the National Commission for Women sport. In 1989 she moved to Germany where in 1990–1994 she worked for the German Table Tennis Federation.

In 2000 she was awarded the Cross of Faithful Service, 3rd class by then-President of Romania Emil Constantinescu.

See also
 List of table tennis players
 List of World Table Tennis Championships medalists

References

External links
 

1933 births
Living people
People from Moldova Nouă
Romanian female table tennis players